Disco Volante (Italian for Flying Saucer) is the second studio album by American experimental rock band Mr. Bungle. It was released on October 10, 1995, through Warner Bros, and is their most experimental album, mixing elements from such varied styles as death metal, jazz, Arabic music, musique concrète, easy listening and even tango.

Background 
The album's title refers to the name of the yacht of the same name featured in the James Bond film Thunderball, literally meaning "Flying Saucer" in Italian. Mr. Bungle had previously covered the film's theme song live and in studio, but it was never officially released.

Disco Volante would be founding member Theo Lengyel's final album with the band, leaving shortly after the tour due to "artistic differences". Band member Danny Heifetz would later comment, "I miss him. He added a huge chemical imbalance that helped us on the road. He hates us and rightfully so. The music changed, plain and simple. Very little call for saxes, trombone or flute. He was an original member. I'm not. Makes me feel a bit like a union-buster."

Regarding the writing process of the album, bassist Trevor Dunn wrote on his website:

Composition 
Disco Volante is their most experimental album. Categorized primarily as experimental rock, avant-garde metal, jazz fusion, and, more broadly, experimental, many of the songs heavily include references of different genres, a staple for Mr. Bungle, including sludge metal ("Everyone I Went to High School With Is Dead"), death metal ("Carry Stress in the Jaw", "Merry Go Bye Bye"), Arabic music ("Desert Search for Techno Allah"), musique concrète and tango ("Violenza Domestica"), jazz fusion ("Ma Meeshka Mow Skwoz", "Platypus"), noise ("The Bends"), and easy listening  (″Backstrokin'″).

Although much of the song's lyrics are limited ("Carry Stress in the Jaw", "Phlegmatics"), are in another language ("Desert Search for Techno Allah", "Violenza Domestica"), or are just gibberish ("Ma Meeshka Mow Skwoz"), lyrical content in Disco Volante is, like in their eponymous debut album, both dark and comedic. Lyrical themes include disconnection and isolation ("Everyone I Went to High School With Is Dead"), "actual teeth-pulling anxiety nightmares" and bruxism ("Carry Stress in the Jaw"), child abuse ("After School Special"), domestic violence ("Violenza Domestica"), the "gradual decline of the human body due to social interactions", as bassist Trevor Dunn elaborates("Phlegmatics"), masturbation ("Backstrokin'"), and martyrdom ("Merry Go Bye Bye").  "The Bends" is a ten minute, almost entirely instrumental, experimental track split into ten different sections, detailing a negligent diver who experiences the bends.

"Carry Stress in the Jaw" and "Phlegmatics" are parts two and three of the "Sleep" trilogy, with part one being on the band's eponymous debut album.

Both "Carry Stress in the Jaw" and "Merry Go Bye Bye" feature untitled hidden tracks. The first is sometimes referred to as "The Secret Song" (after a prominent lyric) or "Spy" (used to denote the song on the band's set lists). The second is sometimes called "Nothing", due to a joke in the liner notes. On vinyl pressings, the album is double grooved the first hidden track is in the second groove, which is notoriously difficult to accurately locate. On CD pressings, the hidden track is simply put immediately after "Carry Stress in the Jaw" on the same track. It was originally recorded without bassist Dunn's input or knowledge; although, shortly before its release, Dunn managed to find it and added a vocal part. Though never explicitly stated, it is believed (by Dunn) that the drums were played by McKinnon, and the bass guitar by Patton. The hidden track after "Merry Go Bye Bye", featuring improv made by the band, begins at 7:21, after a full minute of silence. Neither track is mentioned in any way on the album packaging.

The songs "Coldsore" and " Lemmy Caution" were also recorded for the album but did not make the final cut.

Release 
Disco Volante spawned a number of officially unreleased demos (circulated on internet peer-to-peer sharing networks): "Ma Meeshka Mow Skwoz", "Coldsore" and "Spy". "Coldsore" featured portions later used in "Love on the Event Horizon".

Critical reception 

Disco Volante has been well received by critics. In their highly favorable review of the album, AllMusic wrote, "Mr. Bungle is the musical equivalent of a David Lynch movie", calling the music a "totally original and new musical style, and an album that sounds like nothing that currently exists." They referred to the track "Desert Search for Techno Allah" as "a middle eastern techno number that has to be heard to be believed." Stylus Magazine wrote in their 2005 review, "A decade later, Disco Volante still sounds daring."

Accolades

Track listing

Personnel 
Mr. Bungle
 Danny Heifetz  – drums, percussion, production and sleeve art layout and design
 Trevor Dunn – bass guitar, violin, production and sleeve art layout and design
 Uncooked Meat Prior to State Vector Collapse  – pípá, keyboards, organ, guitar, electronics, production and sleeve art layout and design
 Clinton McKinnon – tenor saxophone, clarinet, keyboards on "After School Special", drums on "Violenza Domestica", production and sleeve art layout and design
 Patton  – vocals, microcassette, organs on "The Bends" and "Backstrokin'", ocarina on "Sleep (Part II): Carry Stress in the Jaw", production and sleeve art layout and design
 Theo  – alto saxophone (credited as "E♭ reeds piped in from Ithaca"), production and sleeve art layout and design

Additional personnel

 William Winant – cymbals on "Chemical Marriage", bongos on "Sleep (Part II): Carry Stress in the Jaw", tabla, kanjira and sistrums on "Desert Search for Techno Allah", jaw harp and percussion on "Violenzia Domestica" and bongos, xylophone and glockenspiel on "Ma Meeshka Mow Skwoz"
 Graham Connah – piano on "Violenza Domestica", "The Bends" and "Platypus"
 Lisandro Adrover – bandoneón on "Violenza Domestica"
 Chris Roberts – engineering
 Mike Bogus – engineering
 David Ogilvy – engineering
 Adam Munoz – engineering
 Trevor Ward – engineering
 Bernie Grundman – mastering
 Athur Hertz – album front cover photography
 Joseph A. Thompson – album outer tray photography
 Davis Meltzer – album booklet backpage photography
 Margaret Murray – sleeve art layout and design
 Gregg Turkington – sleeve art layout and design
 Billy Anderson – engineering, mixing and pre-mastering
 Mike Johnson – engineering and pre-mastering
 Kevin Donlon – engineering

References

External links 
 

Mr. Bungle albums
1995 albums
Warner Records albums
Experimental music albums by American artists
Art rock albums by American artists